Port Williams is an unincorporated community in Clallam County, in the U.S. state of Washington.

History
A post office called Port Williams was established in 1890, and remained in operation until 1919. The community bears the name of an original land developer.

References

Unincorporated communities in Clallam County, Washington
Unincorporated communities in Washington (state)